Anomologinae is a subfamily of moths in the family Gelechiidae.

Taxonomy and systematics
Tribe Anomologini
Anomologa Meyrick, 1926
Aristotelia Hübner, [1825]
Atremaea Staudinger, 1871
Bryotropha Heinemann, 1870
Catameces Turner, 1919
Caulastrocecis Chrétien, 1931
Deltophora Janse, 1950
Dirhinosia Rebel in Penther & Zederbauder, 1905
Dorycnopa Lower, 1901
Enchrysa Zeller, 1873
Gladiovalva Sattler, 1960
Iulota Meyrick, 1904
Ivanauskiella Ivinskis & Piskunov, 1980
Leptogeneia Meyrick, 1904
Megacraspedus Zeller, 1839
Naera Chambers, 1875
Nealyda Dietz, 1900
Numata Busck, 1906
Ornativalva Gozmány, 1955
Paranarsia Ragonot, 1895
Parapodia de Joannis, 1912
Proselotis Meyrick, 1914
Psamathocrita Meyrick, 1925
Ptycerata Ely, 1910
Pycnobathra Lower, 1901
Spiniductellus Bidzilya & Karsholt, 2008
Spiniphallellus Bidzilya & Karsholt, 2008
Stereomita Braun, 1922
Theisoa Chambers, 1874
Tosca Heinrich, 1920
Vadenia Caradja, 1933
Tribe Isophrictini Povolný, 1979
Apodia Heinemann, 1870
Argolamprotes Benander, 1945
Daltopora Povolný, 1979
Eulamprotes Bradley, 1971
Isophrictis Meyrick, 1917
Metzneria Zeller, 1839
Monochroa Heinemann, 1870
Ptocheuusa Heinemann, 1870
Pyncostola Meyrick, 1917
Unplaced to tribe
Clepsimorpha Janse, 1960
Euryctista Janse, 1963
Horridovalva Sattler, 1967
Ischnocraspedus Janse, 1958
Merimnetria Walsingham, 1907
Phanerophalla Janse, 1960
Photodotis Meyrick, 1911
Pycnodytis Meyrick, 1918
Tenera Omelko in Omelko & Omelko, 1998

References

 
Gelechiidae
Moth subfamilies